Teardown may refer to:
 Teardown (real estate), the process of replacing an old building with a new one
 Clearing (telecommunications), a process of circuit disconnection
 Product teardown, a reverse engineering process on consumer devices
 Teardown (video game), a video game by Tuxedo Labs